In enzymology, a phosphomannomutase is an enzyme that catalyzes the chemical reaction

alpha-D-mannose 1-phosphate  D-mannose 6-phosphate

Hence, this enzyme has one substrate, alpha-D-mannose 1-phosphate, and one product, D-mannose 6-phosphate.

This enzyme belongs to the family of isomerases, specifically the phosphotransferases (phosphomutases), which transfer phosphate groups within a molecule.  The systematic name of this enzyme class is alpha-D-mannose 1,6-phosphomutase. Other names in common use include mannose phosphomutase, phosphomannose mutase, and D-mannose 1,6-phosphomutase.  This enzyme participates in fructose and mannose metabolism.  It has 2 cofactors: D-glucose 1,6-bisphosphate,  and D-Mannose 1,6-bisphosphate.

Structural studies

References

 

EC 5.4.2
Enzymes of known structure